Ye Baw Than Khae (also spelt Than Khe) is the current leader and chairman of the All Burma Students' Democratic Front (ABSDF), an insurgent group based in Kayin State, Myanmar (Burma). He was elected chairman of All Burma Students' Democratic Front on 10 April 2001 at the sixth general conference.

Than Khae signed a state-level ceasefire agreement with Kayin State Government representatives on 5 August 2013. On 10 August 2013, he met with the Union Peace Working Committee (UPWC) and signed the Union-level ceasefire agreement at the Myanmar Peace Center in Yangon.

Than Khae signed the Nationwide Ceasefire Agreement (NCA) as ABSDF's representative with the government of Myanmar on 15 October 2015.

See also
 All Burma Students' Democratic Front

References

Burmese military personnel
Living people
Burmese rebels
Place of birth missing (living people)
Year of birth missing (living people)